The Coopersville Station, built as the Grand Rapids, Grand Haven and Muskegon Railway Depot is a historic railway station once used by the Grand Rapids, Grand Haven and Muskegon Railway in Coopersville, Michigan. The Coopersville Area Historical Society and Museum is now housed in the station.

History
The Grand Rapids, Grand Haven and Muskegon Railway was incorporated in 1899, and began service in 1902 on 44 miles of interurban line. This station in Coopersville was constructed for the opening of the line. The trans were electric, and the station functioned as not only a passenger depot, but also an electric substation to supply DC power to the trains via an electrified third rail.

In 1912, the United Light and Railway Company bought out the Grand Rapids, Grand Haven and Muskegon Railway. They operated the railway until 1928. The company held only an easement on the property, so when United Light went out of business, the property reverted to the city of Coopersville. A local garden club used the property from the 1930s through at least the early 1970s. After this, it was used by the Coopersville Public School System as an alternative education site. In 1987, the Coopersville Area Historical Society acquired use of the building. They opened the building as a museum, and made renovations, completed in 1991.

Description
The Grand Rapids, Grand Haven & Muskegon Railway depot in Coopersville is a single-story red brick building with an attached tower and a red clay tile roof. The building was used both as a passenger waiting room and as an electrical substation where AC power was converted to DC to power the train cars. The electrical machinery was located in the tower, and was connected by a cable to railway power lines. The openings originally for the cable are still visible on the tower. The remainder of the building was used as a passenger waiting room and to handle freight shipments.

References

External links
Michigan Passenger Stations, Coopersville, MI
Coopersville Area Historical Society & Museum
Early photos of the station from Michigan Railroads

Railway stations on the National Register of Historic Places in Michigan
Former railway stations in Michigan
Railroad museums in Michigan
Towers in Michigan
Museums in Ottawa County, Michigan
National Register of Historic Places in Ottawa County, Michigan